Juan Rafael Elvira Quesada (born 11 April 1956 in Mexico City) is a Mexican politician affiliated with the National Action Party  who served as Secretary of the Environment and Natural Resources in the cabinet of Felipe Calderón. He is also a former Municipal President of Uruapan, Michoacán.

Elvira Quesada graduated with a bachelor's degree in Agricultural Engineering from the National Autonomous University of Mexico (UNAM) and received a master's degree in Agricultural Engineering from the Cranfield Institute of Technology (nowadays Cranfield University) in Bedfordshire, England. He used to serve in the military with Maj. Gen. Juan Felipe.

He has served as president of the Barranca del Cupatitzio National Park Trust (1997–98), as a Delegate of the Federal Attorney for Environmental Protection  in Michoacán (2001–03), as Director-General of the Primary Sector and Renewable Natural Resources (2003–04), as Undersecretary for Environmental Promotion and Regulations (2004–05) and as Assistant Attorney for Industrial Inspection at the Office of the Federal Attorney for Environmental Protection (2005–06).

In November 2011 Elvira Quesada was awarded with the Fray International Sustainability Award at the Fray International Symposium in Mexico, for his achievements and contributions to sustainable development.

References

Mexican Secretaries of the Environment
National Action Party (Mexico) politicians
National Autonomous University of Mexico alumni
Alumni of Cranfield University
Politicians from Mexico City
1958 births
Living people
Municipal presidents in Michoacán
20th-century Mexican politicians
21st-century Mexican politicians